Castner is a German surname. Notable people with the surname include:

Caspar Castner (1655–1709), German Roman Catholic missionary
Eugene Castner Lewis (1845–1917), American engineer and businessman
Hamilton Castner (1858–1899), American industrial chemist
Joseph Compton Castner (1869–1946), American general
Lawrence V. Castner (1902–1949), American businessman, fencer and military officer
Michael Castner, American journalist
Paul Castner (1897–1986), American baseball player